Ida Mayfield Wood, née Ellen Walsh (14 January 1838 – 12 March 1932) was an American socialite turned recluse who was the third wife of politician and newspaper publisher and editor Benjamin Wood (1820–1900).

Early life and family
She was born Ellen Walsh in England, the daughter of Ann Crawford and Thomas Walsh, a peddler from Ireland, who emigrated to the United States and settled in Massachusetts; her father died in San Francisco in 1864.

Ida changed her name to Ida E. Mayfield, claiming her father was Henry Mayfield, a Louisiana sugar planter, and moved to New York City in 1857 at the age of 19. She set her sights on 37-year-old Benjamin Wood, a married politician and businessman, who co-owned the New York Daily News. She boldly propositioned him in a letter dated May 28 and soon became his mistress. After Wood's second wife died, they married in 1867 (Ida now age 29).

Her husband, besides his involvement with the Daily News, was a three-time member of Congress and two-time member of the New York State Senate. As his wife, she gained entry into the elite level of New York society; in 1860 she danced with the Prince of Wales (and future king) Albert Edward, and met Abraham Lincoln. Her brother-in-law was Fernando Wood, twice mayor of New York City and three-time member of the House of Representatives.

Benjamin was a gambler, once even wagering the Daily News in a card game (he won). Ida, on the other hand, was very careful with money. She got her husband to agree to split his winnings with her, while he was responsible for all of his losses. By the time he died in 1900, she already had possession of essentially all of his wealth by this means.

She herself edited and published the newspaper for a while, but then sold it in 1901 for between $250,000 and $300,000 (equivalent to between $ and $ in ).

In 1907, she closed her bank account, taking out nearly $1 million (equivalent to $ in ). Then Ida, her sister Mary E. Mayfield, and her supposed daughter Emma (eventually revealed to be another sister) took a two-room suite at the Herald Square Hotel, room 552, and became recluses. They had little contact with anyone, even hotel employees, for decades. Maids were not permitted inside to clean the rooms. Emma (1857-1928) died in the hospital at the age of 71. Then, when Mary became very ill, on May 5, 1931, Ida was finally forced to summon help. This intrusion turned out badly for Ida. Mary died, and people became aware of the squalor in which Ida lived. They also discovered how rich she was.

In the midst of the Great Depression, her relatives and their lawyers battled to gain control of her wealth. She was declared incompetent in September 1931 and moved one floor down to two other rooms over her objections. Many hundreds of thousands of dollars in cash and other valuables were found in her suite and in trunks stored in the hotel basement. More than $3,000 a month was spent on her care and protection.

Death
After she died on March 12, 1932, of bronchial pneumonia, at the age of 94, no fewer than 1103 claimants squabbled over her estate. Neither the Wood family nor the Mayfields who came forward to claim her fortune received any of it.  Her estate was finally disbursed to ten authenticated relatives in Ireland, England, and the US.

The truth about her past emerged six months after her death, told by Edward T. Corcoran, a lawyer, later confirmed by Joseph A. Cox, counsel to the New York Public Administrator.

References

Further reading

 Cox, Joseph A. The Recluse of Herald Square: The Mystery of Ida E. Wood. New York: Macmillan, 1964.

1838 births
1932 deaths
People from New York City
American socialites
19th-century American women
20th-century American women
Deaths from bronchopneumonia
20th-century American people
Deaths from pneumonia in New York City